Baechigi (Hangul: 배치기; stylized as BaeChiGi) is a South Korean hip hop duo formed by Sniper Sound in 2005. The duo moved to YMC Entertainment in 2012. They debuted on February 17, 2005, with the album Giant.

Members
 Muwoong (Hangul: 무웅)
 Tak (Hangul: 탁)

Discography

Studio albums

Extended plays

Singles

Soundtrack appearances

Awards and nominations

Mnet Asian Music Awards

|-
|2005
|"Nice to Meet You" (반갑습니다) feat. AG
|Best New Group
|
|-
|2006
|"Turn a Deaf Ear" (마이동풍)
|Best Hip Hop Performance
|
|-
|rowspan="2"|2013
|"Shower of Tears" (눈물샤워) feat. Ailee
|Best Rap Performance
|
|-
|Baechigi
|Discovery of the Year
|
|-

Melon Music Awards

|-
|2013
|"Shower of Tears" (눈물샤워) feat. Ailee
|Best Rap/Hip Hop Song
|
|-

Golden Disk Awards

|-
|2014
|"Shower of Tears" (눈물샤워) feat. Ailee
|Best Rap/Hip Hop Song
|
|-

References

External links
 Baechigi Official Website

Musical groups established in 2005
2005 establishments in South Korea
K-pop music groups
South Korean hip hop groups
Hip hop duos
Musical groups from Seoul
South Korean male rappers
South Korean musical duos
Melon Music Award winners